(1926–2006) was a Japanese-born American mathematician, who specialized in algebraic geometry.

Matsusaka received his Ph.D. in 1952 at Kyoto University; he was a member of the Brandeis Mathematics Department from 1961 until his retirement in 1994, and was that department's chair from 1984–1986. He was invited to address the International Congress of Mathematicians held in Edinburgh in 1958 and was elected to the American Academy of Arts and Sciences in 1966.

During the difficult years after the Second World War, Matsusaka worked on several problems connected with Weil's Foundations of Algebraic Geometry. This led to a correspondence and eventually Weil invited Matsusaka to the University of Chicago (1954–57) where they became life-long friends. After three years at Northwestern University and a year at the Institute for Advanced Study, Princeton, he went to Brandeis University in 1961 where he stayed until 1994, helping to build the department to its current prominence.

Matsusaka was awarded a Guggenheim Fellowship for the academic year 1959–1960.

In 1972, Matsusaka introduced Matsusaka's big theorem, a key technical result on ample line bundles.

Selected publications

References

1926 births
2006 deaths
Algebraic geometers
20th-century Japanese mathematicians
20th-century American mathematicians
21st-century Japanese mathematicians
21st-century American mathematicians
Kyoto University alumni
Brandeis University faculty
Japanese emigrants to the United States
American academics of Japanese descent